Inge Roggeman (born 13 April 1981) is a road cyclist from Belgium. She participated at the 2012 UCI Road World Championships in the Women's team time trial for Sengers Ladies Cycling Team.

References

External links
 profile at Procyclingstats.com

1981 births
Belgian female cyclists
Living people
Place of birth missing (living people)
21st-century Belgian women